The Out-of-Towners is a live album by the jazz trio of Keith Jarrett, Gary Peacock, and Jack DeJohnette, recorded in July 2001 at the Bavarian State Opera in Munich and released by ECM Records in August 2004.

Summer 2001 tour
The Out-of-Towners was recorded during the "Standards Trio" Summer 2001 European tour which had eight dates, mostly in France. An earlier date on the tour, recorded at the Montreux Jazz Festival, produced the 2007 album My Foolish Heart.

 July 16 - Pinède Gould, Juan-les-Pins (France) during the Jazz à Juan festival
 July 18 - Palais des Congrès, Paris (France)
 July 20 - Perugia (Italy) during the Umbria Jazz Festival
 July 22 - Stravinsky Hall, Montreux (Switzerland) during the Montreux Jazz Festival, My Foolish Heart
 July 26 - Teatro Malibran, Venice (Italy) 
 July 28 -  Bavarian State Opera, Munich (Germany)
 August 1 - La Roque d’Antheron (France)
 August 3 - Marciac (France)

Reception

In a review for AllMusic, Thom Jurek wrote: "Being one of contemporary jazz's longest-running bands has its advantages; one of them is having nothing to prove. First and foremost, this band plays standards like no one else. Given their individual careers, the members playing in a trio that performs classics carries a kind of freedom, as well as weight. This material is treated not as museum-piece jazz, but as the essence of song... Besides the wondrous performance, the sound of this recording should be noted. Its warmth is immediate, its very close and intimate sound makes the listener feel as if she were in the middle of the stage taking this all in, not in the audience. This is an accomplishment on all fronts."

The authors of The Penguin Guide to Jazz wrote: "There is some gloriously upbeat playing, like the blues structure of the title-track, and a stunning version of Mulligan's 'Five Brothers.' Indeed, an album which begins relatively slowly takes off with 'I Love You' before kicking into the superb sequence above." They praised Jarrett's encore, calling it "ballad-playing at its absolute finest and worthy of Bill Evans at his greatest."

Writing for The Guardian, John Fordham commented: "There are six tunes here, prefaced by a solo improvised overture that sounds more like a standard than most standards do, before the pianist picks up the tempo with 'I Can't Believe That You're in Love With Me', and Jack DeJohnette's cymbal beat snaps into life. Then the piece builds through Jarrett's characteristic alternation of spaces and cannily late-arriving bursts of notes. The same thing happens at a gentler tempo on 'You've Changed', also a feature for Gary Peacock's measured lyricism on bass. 'I Love You' is probably the standout conventional uptempo piece in the accelerating whirl of Jarrett's dancing phrasing against the racing engine of the other two... But the fascinatingly preoccupied, almost abstract blues of the title track displays more layers and implications than any other - from the pianist's minimal, fragmentary blues figures to Peacock's free-associating rejoinders, and DeJohnette's lateral, pattering brushwork. There'd be an argument for saying the disc was worth it for that fascinating interlude alone."

John Kelman, in a review for All About Jazz, stated: "While not a complete show, The Out-of-Towners still comes closest to capturing a complete concert experience by providing free playing along with standards, and even a solo piano piece... Jarrett's trio has become one of the primary benchmarks for piano trio interplay, and it proves that, as Jarrett has said, 'it's not the material, it's what you bring to the material.' While some have bemoaned the fact that Jarrett appears to have left composition behind, the reality is that with an intuitive interaction that can only come from having played together for over twenty years, Jarrett, Peacock and DeJohnette raise the art of interpretation to a level that defies easy categorization. While they may, for the most part, choose to work existing standards, their playing is so fresh, so vital, that they make each piece sound like a new composition each time they play it."

In an article at Between Sound and Space, Tyran Grillo wrote: "Jarrett... shines at every turn, but his phenomenal rhythm section has rarely sounded more luminescent. Light in their step and playful in their virtuosity, Jarrett's sidemen exude effortlessness."

Track listing 
 "Intro / I Can't Believe That You're in Love With Me" (Clarence Gaskill, McHugh) – 12:10
 "You've Changed" (Carey, Fischer) – 8:13
 "I Love You" (Porter) – 10:00
 "The Out-of-Towners" (Jarrett) – 19:45
 "Five Brothers" (Gerry Mulligan) – 11:12
 "It's All in the Game" (Dawes, Sigman) – 6:47

Personnel
Keith Jarrett – piano
Gary Peacock – double bass
Jack DeJohnette – drums

Production
 Manfred Eicher - producer
 Martin Pearson - engineer (recording)
 Morten Lund - engineer (mastering)
 Sascha Kleis - design
 Thomas Wunsch - cover photo
 Wilfried Hösl - liner photos
 Roberto Masotti - liner photos (trio)

Charts

Notes 

Standards Trio albums
Keith Jarrett live albums
Gary Peacock live albums
Jack DeJohnette live albums
2004 live albums
ECM Records live albums
Albums produced by Manfred Eicher